John Neal: Early American literary nationalist and regionalist 
Edgar Allan Poe: Dark Romanticism, Short-Story Theory
T. S. Eliot: Modernism
Harold Bloom: Aestheticism
Susan Sontag: Against Interpretation, On Photography
John Updike: Literary realism/modernism and aestheticist critic
M. H. Abrams: The Mirror and the Lamp (study of Romanticism)
F. O. Matthiessen: originated the concept "American Renaissance"
Perry Miller: Puritan studies
Henry Nash Smith: founder of the "Myth and Symbol School" of American criticism
Leo Marx: The Machine in the Garden (study of technology and culture)
Leslie Fiedler: Love and Death in the American Novel
Stanley Fish: Pragmatism
Henry Louis Gates: African-American literary theory
Gerald Vizenor: Native American literary theory
William Dean Howells: Literary realism
Stephen Greenblatt: New Historicism
Geoffrey Hartman: Yale school of deconstruction
John Crowe Ransom: New Criticism
Cleanth Brooks: New Criticism
Kenneth Burke: Rhetoric studies
Elaine Showalter: Feminist criticism
Sandra M. Gilbert: Feminist criticism
Susan Gubar: Feminist criticism
Alicia Ostriker: feminist criticism
J. Hillis Miller: Deconstruction
Edward Said: Postcolonial criticism
Jonathan Culler: Critical theory, deconstruction
Judith Butler: Post-structuralist feminism
Gloria E. Anzaldúa: Latina literary theory
Ilan Stavans: Latino cultural theory
Frederick Luis Aldama: Latino literature in the United States
Eve Kosofsky Sedgwick: Queer theory
Fredric Jameson: Marxist criticism

American literary critics
 
North American literature
English-language literature
Literature